The 1993 Kent State Golden Flashes football team was an American football team that represented Kent State University in the Mid-American Conference (MAC) during the 1993 NCAA Division I-A football season. In their third and final season under head coach Pete Cordelli, the Golden Flashes compiled a 0–11 record (0–9 against MAC opponents), finished in last place in the MAC, and were outscored by all opponents by a combined total of 357 to 149.

The team's statistical leaders included Raeshuan Jernigan with 770 rushing yards, Kevin Shuman with 1,022 passing yards, and Brian Dusho with 890 receiving yards.

Schedule

References

Kent State
Kent State Golden Flashes football seasons
College football winless seasons
Kent State Golden Flashes football